Following are games based on the Pink Panther:
 The Pink Panther (1983), a hand-held LCD game from Tiger Electronics.
 Pink Panther (video game), 1988 video game.
 Pink Goes to Hollywood, 1993 video game.
 The Pink Panther: Passport to Peril, 1996 video game.
 The Pink Panther: Hokus Pokus Pink, 1997 video game.
 Pink Panther: Pinkadelic Pursuit, 2002 video game.
 CR Pink Panther (CRピンクパンサー, CR pinkupansā), (2004) a series of four pachinko games has been released in Japan by Fuji Shogi.
 Pink Panther's Epic Adventure (2015) for iOS and Android.

References

Video games based on animated television series